KPISS.FM is an eclectic online radio station inspired by WFMU, CBC, CJSR, and other college radio in general. It was founded by and continues to be run by station manager Sheri Barclay and a panoply of like-minded volunteer DJs.

KPISS is notable for having broadcast from a specially rigged RV in the Bushwick neighborhood of Brooklyn, New York. With the onset of the COVID-19 pandemic, the station has modified its broadcasting set-up to shows done remotely from the respective DJs' homes.

References 

2016 establishments in New York City
Brooklyn
Internet radio stations in the United States
Radio stations established in 2016